(The Issues Relevant to Psychology) is a bimonthly Russian-language academic journal covering diverse areas of psychology and psychotherapy. The journal is included in the list of the Higher Attestation Commission and is also indexed in the Social Sciences Citation Index and Current Contents/Social & Behavioral Sciences.

History and academic reputation

Yet, the second decade of 21st century demonstrated gradual, but steady decline of the journal's academic reputation and impact, and, according to the national rating of Russian scholarly publications, the Russian Science Citation Index (RSCI),  currently occupies the 20th place (20/98) on the list of top-rated academic journals in psychology in Russian Federation.

According to research published by a Russian volunteer community network working to clean Russian science of plagiarism, the Dissernet, this journal is qualified as a "Journal with considerable deviations from academic publishing standards".

Thematic coverage
The journal has the following rubrics:
 Theoretical Research
 Developmental and Pedagogical Psychology
 Psychology in High School
 Psychology and Practice
 Psychological counselling
 History of psychology
 Experimental Research
 Scientific Events
 Our Anniversaries

See also
 List of psychology journals
 List of psychotherapy journals

References

External links
  

Psychology journals
Psychotherapy journals
Bimonthly journals
Publications established in 1955
Russian-language journals
1955 establishments in Russia
1955 establishments in the Soviet Union